In Hindu temple architecture, tala is a tier or storey of a shikhara, vimana, or gopuram. It is an important compositional element, which is especially distinct in the Dravidian architecture.

Dravidian vimanas
Vimanas above the sanctum are typically shaped as a four-sided pyramid, consisting of progressively smaller talas. Dravidian vimanas can be classified as one-story (called ekatala), two-story (dvi-tala), three-story (tri-tala), and so on. Usually, vimanas have up to seven stories. However, the tallest gopurams and vimanas, such as that of the Ranganathaswamy Temple in Srirangam, may have up to 13 talas.

Importantly, the kuta at the top of a vimana does not count as a separate tala. As a major horizontal division of a temple, in the middle each tala has a wall zone with slender pilasters. The side parts are usually heavily decorated with statues, which may add up to hundreds. Many temples claim that each one of such statues is unique.

Vimanas are divided in two groups: jati vimanas that have up to four talas and mukhya vimanas that have five talas and more.

References

Hindu temple architecture